The Battle of Romny was a series of military engagements in the Romny Municipality, Sumy Oblast which began on 24 February 2022, during the 2022 Russian invasion of Ukraine, as part of the Northeastern Ukraine offensive.

Background
Romny is a town in rural Sumy Oblast, with about 38,000 residents. The city is strategically important because it is located on highway H07, which connects Sumy, Brovary, Nedryhailiv, and the Ukrainian capital Kyiv, and therefore connecting the Kyiv offensive and Northeastern Ukraine offensive together.

Battle

24-28 February 
On the evening of February 24, the first day of the Russian invasion, two convoys of Russian soldiers coming from the cities of Nedryhailiv and Konotop (east and north of Romny, respectively) made their way in the direction of Romny.

Between February 26 and 27, more Russian vehicles headed towards Romny from Krasnopillia, bypassing Sumy. According to the head of Romny Raion, Denis Vashchenko, there were no wounded, killed, or shelling during this time. The second convoy was bombed by Ukrainian forces before it reached Romny.

On February 28, Russian forces attacked the Romny Correctional Colony. Meanwhile that same day, Russian forces crushed a civilian in the village of Pogozha Krynytsia when he attempted to use his car to block Russian tanks passing through.

1-4 March 
On the first day of March, Russian forces captured the villages of Bilovods'ke and Bobryk, just south of Romny, which had been contested in previous days. On March 4, after negotiations with Russia and Ukraine, Romny was selected as a humanitarian corridor for civilians fleeing Sumy, Kharkiv, and Chernihiv oblasts. That same day, civilians from the village of Spartak attempted to block Russian vehicles passing from Nedryhailiv to Romny. They succeeded in blocking the road, although an ensuing attack by the Russians resulted in one civilian dying. Later that evening on March 4, Russian forces blocked the road from Lypova Dolyna towards Romny and Bilovod'ske, in southern Romny Raion, while the highway between Nedryhailiv and Romny was still under Ukrainian control. 

During the night between March 4 and 5, Russian soldiers destroyed a poultry farm, killed around 100,000 poultry and causing an estimated one million hryvnias worth of damage.

March 5 
On March 5, three out of four hostages who were taken by Russian troops were released, according to Vashchenko. That same day, Russian soldiers standing on the road fired at Ukrainian TDF troops at a gas station, leaving one Ukrainian soldier killed and two wounded. On the evening of March 5, Russian soldiers fired at two cars traveling from Sumy to Romny, in the village of Pustovyitivka. 3 civilians were wounded, and one civilian was killed in the shooting. Later that evening, in the village of Skripali' in Romny raion, Ukrainian forces destroyed a Russian column, and killed an unspecified number of soldiers.

In the evening between March 5 and 6, shots were fired in Pustoviitivka and Romny, with no injuries. The shooting in Romny, however, knocked out electricity for parts of the town.

8-19 March 
On March 11, Vashchenko reported that Ukrainian forces unblocked the road between Romny and Lokhvytsia, allowing civilians to flee southwards. That morning near Romny, police and Ukrainian TDF discovered and detained 29 Russian soldiers in a field, all of whom claimed to be lost.

The next day on March 12, green corridors were established in Sumy Oblast, where civilians from Sumy, Trostianets, Konotop, Lebedyn, Velyka Pisaryvka, and Krasnopillia could flee towards Poltava Oblast. Humanitarian corridors restarted again on March 18.

The Ukrainian General Staff reported on March 19 that the 1st Guards Tank Army of Russia began to concentrate efforts on surrounding Sumy, while also attempting offensives in Trostianets, Pryluky, and Romny, although these offensives did not succeed.

Russian withdrawal
Russian forces began to withdraw from Romny raion on April 1, through a corridor from Kyiv and Chernihiv oblasts through Romny towards the Russian state border, following the Ukrainian victory in the Northeastern Ukraine offensive. The withdrawal ended on April 4.

References

Battles of the 2022 Russian invasion of Ukraine
February 2022 events in Ukraine
March 2022 events in Ukraine
April 2022 events in Ukraine
Northeastern Ukraine campaign
History of Sumy Oblast